The Netherlands Antilles competed in the Winter Olympic Games for the first time at the 1988 Winter Olympics in Calgary, Alberta, Canada.

Competitors
The following is the list of number of competitors in the Games.

Bobsleigh

Luge

Men

References

Official Olympic Reports
 Olympic Winter Games 1988, full results by sports-reference.com

Nations at the 1988 Winter Olympics
1988 Winter Olympics
Oly